Ekinrin-Adde is a town located in Ijumu L.G.A. of Kogi State, in the Western Senatorial District of Nigeria on latitude 7° 50’N and longitude 5° 50’E  at an altitude of 523 metres above sea level.
The town is a conglomerate of contiguous villages that amalgamated into one. The people trace their ancestry to Ile-Ife, the cradle of Yoruba civilization. The people are a sub-ethnic group within the Yoruba nationality, who speak a dialect generally referred to as Okun, widely spoken by the five local Government that make up the Kogi West Senatorial District although with slight variation from community to community. The Okun dialect is a sub-dialect of the Yoruba language.

History
According to oral tradition, The first settler was a hunter called “Akinrin” who was said to have migrated in the 12th century with his siblings from Ile-Ife during the reign of Ooni Aworokolokin. Ekinrin-Adde was separated from the present-day Ondo state by a very big mountain known as “Oluko”. Ekinrin people are the first settlers in the community, later the “Adde”. In 1865 the people of Adde began the resettlement of their villages in Ekinrin-Adde.People began to move from their settlement such as Ilafe, Ilaga, Abudo, Okedagba and so on to live with Ekinrin people and they all became one community and hence the name Ekinrin-Adde. History, written and oral, claim that the people of Adde group are descendants of Esein and Omoye (husband and wife), who were said to have left Ile-Ife on farming and hunting expeditions.

Ekinrin-Adde was very important in the economic activities of Okun  land during the pre-colonial era. There existed some economic activities such as hunting, fishing, agriculture, trade and commerce.

Location
Ekinrin-Adde is located in Ijumu Local Government Area of Kogi state and bordered by Iyamoye and Egbeda Egga. Ekinrin-Adde is 20 minutes drive from Ekiti state and shares other cultures with villages on the same axis.

Culture
The Ekinrin-Adde people are united by several practices such as Egungun (masquerade) festival. Masquerades usually parade during a particular season and also when an eminent person who holds or who is in a position of authority dies. Notable masquerades includes the Olori Owo (women are forbidden from seeing them), Oyoyo (comes out during the Emindin festival) and the Ajibele masquerade. Another cultural festival usually carried out on the 20th day of June every year is the Emidin festival. The “Emindin” festival is usually called out by the omo agba people from Ona the royal clan.

Geography
The general nature of Ekinrin-Adde land is predominantly Savannah with undulating plains. There are deep hills, which marks the eastern and western edge. The soil is light brown, sandy and a little lateritic on the plain stony soil in the hills with rare patches of red earth. Due to the nature of the soil, most of the residents are farmers and common farm produce include yam, cassava, pepper, beans, cocoyam, melon and palm oil.

Natural Resources & Tourist Attraction
Ekinrin-Adde is very rich in white marble. The marble deposit in Ekinrin-Adde, based on its chemical composition is a pure carbonate and a typical calcitic-type marble. The marble deposit in Ekinrin-Adde is suitable for the manufacture of cement, production of sodium alkalis (sodium carbonate, bicarbonate and hydroxide), pesticide, poultry feed, calcium ammonium nitrate fertilizer and as a refractory lime.

Notable tourist spots include the Akogba hill (1000m above sea level) and Oyi river.

Festivals
Emidin Festival is the annual new yam festival of the Ekinrin people. Emidin festival is usually celebrated in June. In the very old days, barns of yams shows the wealth of a person, someone with a large collection of yams marked prestige. 
From planting till harvest, the process of farming yam is taken sacred by the Ekinrin-Adde's culture. Around June, the first yams are harvested and celebrated by the people. Men would dig up their first yams for display and the farmers with the biggest yams are often admired. After the celebration, the yams are cooked or roasted with the women guiding the procession.

This festival also serves as a period to thank the gods for a bountiful harvest and also to ask for abundant rains for the next planting season. It's a common practice for most indigenes of the town to return home to celebrate, meet their family members and also an age group reunion opportunity. 
According to tradition, it is unacceptable for the community member to eat new yam before the celebration.
 Other festivals are Idi Festival,Okẹlẹkẹlẹ festival and a new festival for hiking the Akogba Mountain. The Akogba Mountain is one of the natural endowments of Ekinrin-Adde. A giant Monolith sitting in a pristine state in the north-west  of the community overlooking the town as well as being the source of the mysterious Akogba Spring. Although it's not the only Mountain surrounding this beautiful community, it's arguably the most prominent at an alititude of  about 3500 feet(1050m above sea level)

Education
Ekinrin-Adde has various primary and secondary schools. Most of the old ones were established through communal efforts and by collaboration with early missionaries. Among the very notable ones is Baptist High School, established by missionary John B. Hill, and his son Baker.

Kings and Traditional Rulers

Notable people from Ekinrin-Adde
Some prominent sons and daughters of Ekinrin-Adde are:

1. Abiodun Faleke - Politician and a member of Nigeria's House of Representatives  of Lagos

2. Professor Olayemi Akinwunmi - Vice Chancellor, Federal University, Lokoja

3. Babajide Otitoju - multiple award-winning investigative journalist and political analyst

4. Folashade Joseph - Managing Director, Nigeria Agricultural Insurance Scheme.

5.Rt Honourable Justice JA Fabiyi (JSC Rtd)

6. General J.O.S Oshanupin (The Asiwaju of Ekinrin-Adde).

7. Rt Hon. Justice Alaba Omolaye-Ajileye.

8.Navy Commander LMA Fabiyi (Rtd).

References 

Populated places in Kogi State
Towns in Nigeria
Towns in Yorubaland